Kamahariya is a village development committee in Rupandehi District in Lumbini Province of southern Nepal.

Demographics
At the time of the 1991 Nepal census it had a population of 5641 people living in 912 individual households.

References

Populated places in Rupandehi District